Mohammad Naji (born 30 October 1993) is a Saudi Arabian professional footballer who plays as a defender for Pro League side Al-Batin.

Career
Mohammad Naji started his career at Radwa playing in the Saudi Third Division. On 19 July 2016, Naji left Radwa and joined First Division side Ohod. He was part of the squad that earned promotion to the Pro League for the first time since 2005. On 19 August 2018, Naji left Ohod and joined Al-Jeel on a one-year contract. On 24 June 2019, Naji left Al-Jeel and joined Pro League side Al-Fateh on a three-year contract. On 3 July 2022, Naji joined Al-Batin.

References

External links
 
 

Living people
1993 births
People from Medina Province (Saudi Arabia)
Association football defenders
Saudi Arabian footballers
Radwa Club players
Ohod Club players
Al Jeel Club players
Al-Fateh SC players
Al Batin FC players
Saudi Fourth Division players
Saudi First Division League players
Saudi Professional League players